Myloplus rhomboidalis, is a medium to large omnivorous fish of the family Serrasalmidae from South America, where found in the Amazon River basin, as well as the north and the eastern Guiana Shield rivers.

References

Planquette, P., P. Keith and P.-Y. Le Bail, 1996. Atlas des poissons d'eau douce de Guyane. Tome 1. Collection du Patrimoine Naturel Volume 22, MNHN, Paris & INRA, Paris. 429 p.

Serrasalmidae
Fish of the Amazon basin
Taxa named by Georges Cuvier
Fish described in 1818